Anogdus dissimilis is a species of round fungus beetles in the family Leiodidae. It is found in North America.

References

 Daffner, Hermann (1988). "Revision der Nordamerikanischen Arten der Cyrtusa - Verwandtschaft (Coleoptera Leiodidae Leiodini)". Annali dei Musei Civici - Rovereto, 269–306.
 Peck, Stewart B., and Joyce Cook (2013). "A revision of the species of Anogdus LeConte of the United States and Canada (Coleoptera: Leiodidae: Leiodinae: Leiodini)". Insecta Mundi, no. 0290, 1-27.

Further reading

 NCBI Taxonomy Browser, Anogdus dissimilis
 Arnett, R. H. Jr., M. C. Thomas, P. E. Skelley and J. H. Frank. (eds.). (21 June 2002). American Beetles, Volume II: Polyphaga: Scarabaeoidea through Curculionoidea. CRC Press LLC, Boca Raton, Florida .
 Arnett, Ross H. (2000). American Insects: A Handbook of the Insects of America North of Mexico. CRC Press.
 Richard E. White. (1983). Peterson Field Guides: Beetles. Houghton Mifflin Company.

Leiodidae
Beetles described in 1916